The six-year itch, according to political scientists, is the pattern which takes place during a US president's sixth year in office. This year is characterized by the nation's disgruntled attitude towards the president and their political party. During this time, there is a midterm election and the party in power usually loses a significant number of seats in Congress.

History

Pre-Reconstruction
Prior to Reconstruction, the six-year itch saw the president's party gain seats in one house, while losing seats in the other house. Presidents before Reconstruction whose party had this occur:

 1814 – Democratic-Republican James Madison: Gained 5 seats in the House, but lost 2 seats in the Senate.
 1822 – Democratic-Republican James Monroe: Gained 34 seats in the House, while the Senate was unchanged.
 1834 – Democrat Andrew Jackson: Lost 0 seats in the House (the smallest swing in the House's history), but gained 1 seat in the Senate and gained control of the chamber.

Democratic-Republican Thomas Jefferson was the only two-term president before Reconstruction not to have this occur. In 1806, his party gained 2 seats in the House and gained 1 seat in the Senate. Also, the Republican Party saw strong gains in the midterms of 1866, although Andrew Johnson, a former Democrat who had been elected as Abraham Lincoln's vice president on the National Union ticket, was president at the time. The Republicans gained 40 seats in the House and 18 seats in the Senate (the largest swing in the history of the Senate).

Post-Reconstruction
After Reconstruction, the six-year itch saw the president's party consistently lose seats in both houses. Presidents since Reconstruction whose party had this occur:

 1874  – Republican Ulysses S. Grant: Lost 93 seats in the House*, lost 10 seats in the Senate.
 1894  – Democrat Grover Cleveland (although this was his second term, it was not consecutive with his first): Lost 127 seats in the House* (the largest swing in the House's history), lost 4 seats in the Senate*.
 1918  – Democrat Woodrow Wilson: Lost 22 seats in the House*, lost 5 seats in the Senate*.
 1938 – Democrat Franklin D. Roosevelt: Lost 72 seats in the House, lost 7 seats in the Senate.
 1950  – Democrat Harry S. Truman: Lost 28 seats in the House, lost 5 seats in the Senate.
 1958  – Republican Dwight D. Eisenhower: Lost 48 seats in the House^, lost 13 seats in the Senate^.
 1974  – Republican Richard Nixon (although Gerald Ford was president when the elections took place that year): Lost 48 seats in the House^, lost 4 seats in the Senate^.
 1986  – Republican Ronald Reagan: Lost 5 seats in the House^, lost 8 seats in the Senate*.
 2006  – Republican George W. Bush: Lost 30 seats in the House*, lost 6 seats in the Senate*.
 2014 – Democrat Barack Obama: Lost 13 seats in the House^, lost 9 seats in the Senate*.

*: The losses by the president's party resulted in the other party gaining control of this chamber.^: Although the president's party lost seats, this chamber was already under the control of the opposition party.

Democrat Bill Clinton is the only two-term president since Reconstruction not to have this occur. In 1998, his party gained 5 seats in the House of Representatives and the Senate was unchanged (the smallest swing in the Senate's history). His party was uniquely in the minority in both houses of Congress and remained so after the elections.

On only three occasions has the six-year itch caused the president's party to lose control of Congress completely: Grover Cleveland in 1894, Woodrow Wilson in 1918, and George W. Bush in 2006. Conversely, only two presidents saw their parties maintain control of Congress even after the six-year itch: Democrats Franklin D. Roosevelt in 1938 and Harry S. Truman in 1950. Only two presidents already had a Congress that was completely dominated by the opposition party by the time of the six-year itch: Republicans Dwight D. Eisenhower in 1958 and Richard Nixon (Gerald Ford at the time of the elections) in 1974. In addition, only one president has ever lost control of one house while keeping the other: Republican Ulysses S. Grant in 1874, who lost the House but kept the Senate. Republican Ronald Reagan lost the Senate in 1986 due to the six-year itch, but his party never controlled the House during his presidency. Lastly, the only  president to have lost one house of Congress due to the six-year itch after already losing the other one was Democrat Barack Obama in 2014 (in both cases, their respective parties lost the Senate while the House was already under the control of the opposition party).

Comparison with other midterms
Overall, the six-year itch phenomena may be viewed as an extension of "the midterm effect" where a president's party almost always loses seats in midterm elections. Since Reconstruction, only four presidents have ever seen their party gain seats in a midterm election: Democrats Franklin D. Roosevelt in 1934, Bill Clinton in 1998, George W. Bush in 2002 and Joe Biden in 2022. Some of these exceptions have occurred alongside major events, such as the Great Depression and September 11 attacks.

The losses suffered during a president's second midterm tend to be more pronounced than during their first midterm.

See also

References
"The Curse of the Six-Year Itch" The Atlantic Monthly, March 1986, issue. Volume 257, Number 3 (pages 22–28).

6 (number)
Presidency of the United States
Political terminology of the United States
United States presidential history